Andreas Buchner (born 15 May 1985 in Kösching) is a retired German footballer. He made his debut on the professional league level when he came on as a substitute for FC Ingolstadt 04 in the 65th minute in the 2. Bundesliga game against SC Freiburg on 2 November 2008. He scored a goal four minutes after coming onto the pitch.

In June 2014, he renewed his expiring contract with FC Ingolstadt 04 for another two years. However it was reported that he shall especially be a leading figure in their reserve team, playing in fourth tier Regionalliga Bayern.

References

External links
 
 Staffel Bayern: Andreas Buchner at dfb.de 
 

1985 births
Living people
German footballers
FC Ingolstadt 04 players
2. Bundesliga players
3. Liga players
Regionalliga players
Association football midfielders
FC Ingolstadt 04 II players